Beware of Those is the fifth album released by Mac Mall and the eighth album released by JT the Bigga Figga. It was released on June 27, 2000, by Get Low Recordz and featured production from Mac Mall and JT the Bigga Figga.

Track listing
"Beware of Those" – 3:49  
"Don't Move" – 1:40  
"Crestside to Fillmore" (featuring Messy Marv) – 4:11
"Régime Life" (featuring Tha Gamblaz) – 3:31 
"Fully Loaded" (featuring San Quinn, Messy Marv) – 3:28 
"Hit 'Em Where It Hurts" – 3:09   
"Meal Ticket" – 4:35  
"Gangstaz" – 4:14  
"Young Ritzy" (featuring Guce) – 4:30  
"Thug Poetry" – 3:53  
"Block Monsters" (featuring C-Bo) – 4:31  
"What's the Decision" (featuring E-40) – 4:41 
"Verbal Haters" – 3:17  
"All My G's" – 4:28  
"Did It, Did It" – 4:07  
"Outlawz" (featuring Outlawz) – 5:44
Unlisted bonus track – 3:27  
Unlisted bonus track – 4:51

2000 albums
Mac Mall albums
JT the Bigga Figga albums